Bonjongo (Wonjongo) Town is a locality in the Buea Municipality in the Fako Division of the South West Region of Cameroon.

Overview 
Bonjongo is a second class chiefdom in the Buea Council Area. It is home to Cameroonians mostly of the Bakweri origin.

Notable institutions 

 Presbyterian Church
 G.H.S Bonjongo
 St. Paul's College Bonjongo

References 

Populated places in Southwest Region (Cameroon)